Novoobintsevo is a rural locality (a selo) and the administrative center of Novoobintsevsky Selsoviet, Shelabolikhinsky District, Altai Krai, Russia. The population was 935 as of 2013. There are 6 streets.

Geography 
Novoobintsevo is located 11 km east of Shelabolikha (the district's administrative centre) by road. Malinovka is the nearest rural locality.

References 

Rural localities in Shelabolikhinsky District